The 2009 Rabo Ster Zeeuwsche Eilanden was the 12th edition of the Ster Zeeuwsche Eilanden, a women's cycling stage race in the Netherlands. It was part of the 2009 women's road cycling season. It was rated by the UCI as a category 2.2 race and was held between 20 and 22 June 2009.

Stages

Stage 1
18 June – Vlissingen to Vlissingen,  (Individual time trial)

Stage 2
19 June – Middelburg to Vlissingen,

Stage 3
20 June – Westkapelle to Westkapelle,

General classification

See also
 2009 in women's road cycling

References

External links
 

2009 in women's road cycling
Ster Zeeuwsche Eilanden
2009 in Dutch sport